Decatur Boulevard is a major north–south section line arterial in the Las Vegas metropolitan area located on the west side of the city.

Route
Decatur Boulevard is situated in the west of Las Vegas and runs for roughly 25 miles along a north–south axis. At the southern end, at the junction with West Cactus Avenue, the road becomes Southern Highland Parkway. U.S. Route 95 delineates the road as South Decatur Boulevard and North Decatur Boulevard. It is crossed twice by the Las Vegas Beltway and provides access to the North Las Vegas Airport. At the northern end, it dead ends at a roundabout at the Clark County Shooting Complex.

Part of the southern section of the Boulevard is known as the location of a number of live music venues. Notable places located along the road include Arizona Charlie's Decatur and an office of the Nevada Department of Motor Vehicles.

South Decatur Boulevard has another section of road in Sloan, along with three other north–south roads, Cameron Street, Arville Street, and Hinson Street, off of Sloan Road acting as an access road to the Sierra Ready Mix South Plant. It is a dead-end road without any outlets.

History
Decatur Boulevard was named after the city of Decatur, Illinois in the 1930s by Leonard Frechette, who lived on the junction of the street and Vegas Drive. The city was itself named in honor of Stephen Decatur, a naval officer during the early 19th century.

A $46 million Clark County construction project that widened much of Decatur Boulevard and introduced a railroad crossing for both Decatur Blvd and Warm Springs Road under the Union Pacific tracks was completed in summer 2010. Sewerage along parts of the route was renewed in spring 2011.

Major intersections

Public transport
RTC Transit Route 103 functions on this road.

References

External links
 

Streets in Las Vegas
Streets in the Las Vegas Valley